Heather Rima Te Wiata  (born 15 March 1963) is a New Zealand singer, comedian and stage, film and television actress.

Early life 
Te Wiata was born in London, the only child of opera singer Inia Te Wiata and actress Beryl Te Wiata, on 15 March 1963. She is of the Ngāti Raukawa tribe. Her father died when she was eight years old, and she and her mother returned to New Zealand two years later. They settled in Auckland, where Te Wiata attended Epsom Girls' Grammar School.

Career 
Te Wiata first appeared on stage in The Prime of Miss Jean Brodie at Auckland's Mercury Theatre, and later attended the New Zealand Drama School. After graduating in 1983, she went on a six month national tour, singing in Footrot Flats.

She made her screen debut in 1986 on the long-running Australian soap Sons and Daughters, playing the role of Janice Reid for two years. On her return to New Zealand she appeared in a number of television series including Shortland Street, the police drama Shark in the Park, comedies The Billy T James Show and Porters, and sketch shows Laughinz, Issues and More Issues. Her roles in these sketch shows were written by David McPhail, Jon Gadsby and A. K. Grant and included impersonations of politician and future Prime Minister Helen Clark and newsreader Judy Bailey. The show won her the Viewers' Choice Most Popular Female on TV Award for two consecutive years, before she left the series in 1992.

Te Wiata next spent two years working on the Australian sketch comedy show Full Frontal and also began appearing in films, including Send a Gorilla (1988), Cops and Robbers (1993),  Hinekaro Goes on a Picnic and Blows Up another Obelisk (1995) and Via Satellite (1998).

Te Wiata's stage appearances have included starring roles as Sally Bowles in Cabaret, Lady Macbeth in Macbeth, the voice of the cannibalistic singing plant in Little Shop of Horrors and directing and acting in The Vagina Monologues in Dunedin.

In 2014 she appeared in horror comedy Housebound and in 2016 in Hunt for the Wilderpeople.

In 2017, Te Wiata starred in season two of the podcast Within the Wires portraying artist and historian Roimata Mangakāhia.

Te Wiata has also released a self-titled jazz album, and toured with the New Zealand Symphony Orchestra.

Honours and awards
In 2016, Te Wiata won the New Zealand Film Award for Best Supporting Actress for her role in Hunt for the Wilderpeople. In the 2017 New Year Honours, she was appointed a Member of the New Zealand Order of Merit, for services to film and television.

In October 2019 she was presented with a Scroll of Honour from the Variety Artists Club of New Zealand for her contribution to New Zealand entertainment.

References

1963 births
Living people
20th-century New Zealand actresses
21st-century New Zealand actresses
Ngāti Raukawa people
New Zealand Māori actresses
New Zealand comedians
New Zealand film actresses
New Zealand stage actresses
New Zealand musical theatre actresses
New Zealand podcasters
New Zealand television actresses
New Zealand women comedians
New Zealand women podcasters
Members of the New Zealand Order of Merit
People educated at Epsom Girls' Grammar School
Toi Whakaari alumni